Flexclusive is the stage name of Felix Owusu Ankrah, a Ghanaian born the Netherlands based singer, rapper, producer  and is CEO of Flexclusive Music Entertainment.

Ankrah was born in Kumasi Ghana but moved to Europe to settle with his parents in Amsterdam at an early age, and began making music in his early school days. He had his elementary education at Kings International School in Kumasi, Ghana and then attended ROC Flevoland in the Netherlands before earning himself a bachelor's degree in International Music Management from Inholland University of Applied Sciences.

Recognition and musical style
Flexclusive caught the public's eye when he released the remix version of his single “Anything For You” featuring “Itz Tiffany”, which enjoyed massive airplay Ghana, the Netherlands, Belgium, UK, Canada and the US. In 2013 Flexclusive was nominated and won the best song of the year with the hit single "The One" at the African Diaspora Awards which was held in Amsterdam, Netherlands. In 2014 he was nominated for the African Diaspora Awards for the best song of the year and the best collaboration of the year.

Currently in 2015, Flexclusive's official single entitled “Woman” which features Dr Cryme and produced by Mix Masta Garzy.

Awards and nominations

African Diaspora Awards
 "Best Song Of The Year 2013" - Won
 "Best Video of the year 2013" - Nominee
 "Best artist Of The Year 2013" - Nominee
 "Best song of the Year 2014" - Nominee
 "Best collaboration of the year 2014" - Nominee

Discography
 Long Way Album (2011)

Singles
 Woman featuring Dr Cryme Produced by MixMasta Garzy

References

External links
 Official website
 Official Music Profile on GhanaMusic.Com
 Flexclusive Music Videos
 Music on Itunes

1986 births
Living people
Ghanaian rappers
People from Kumasi